Ames is a municipality of the autonomous community of Galicia, Spain in the province of A Coruña with an area of , population of 26,983 inhabitants (INE, 2009) and a density of . It belongs to the comarca of Santiago de Compostela.

Parroquias

Agrón (San Lourenzo)
Ameixenda (Santa María)
Ames (Santo Tomé)
Biduído (Santa María)
Bugallido (San Pedro)
Covas (San Estebo)
Lens (San Paio)
Milladoiro (Santa María)
Ortoño (San Xoán)
Piñeiro (San Mamede)
Tapia (San Cristovo)
Trasmonte (Santa María)

Gallery

References

Municipalities in the Province of A Coruña